Albert Green (7 October 1892 – 23 April 1956) was an English professional footballer who played in the Football League for Charlton Athletic and Reading as an inside forward. He had a long association with Southern League club Watford and also played for Crystal Palace of the same division.

Personal life 
Green served as a private in the Hertfordshire Yeomanry during the First World War. He was discharged from the Army due to sickness or wounds received during the course of his service, for which he was awarded the Silver War Badge.

Career statistics

Honours 
Watford

 Southern League Premier Division: 1914–15

References 

English footballers
English Football League players
Southern Football League players

1892 births
Watford F.C. players
Reading F.C. players
British Army personnel of World War I
1956 deaths
People from Rickmansworth
Association football inside forwards
Crystal Palace F.C. players
Sheppey United F.C. players
Charlton Athletic F.C. players
Millwall F.C. players
Hertfordshire Yeomanry soldiers
Footballers from Hertfordshire